OMS or Oms may refer to:

Education
 Oakland Middle School, Murfreesboro, Tennessee
 O'Banion Middle School, Garland, Texas
 Odle Middle School, Bellevue, Washington
 Orefield Middle School, Orefield, Pennsylvania
 Open Mind School, Redwood City, California
 List of Old Marlburians, alumni of Marlborough College, Wiltshire, England
 Old Millfieldians, alumni of Millfield School, Somerset, England
 Oakdale Middle School, Ijamsville, Maryland
 Ozaukee Middle School, Fredonia, Wisconsin
 Osborn Middle School, Phoenix, Arizona
 Osceola Middle School, Ocala, Florida
 Ontario Middle School, Ontario Oregon

Medicine
 Opsoclonus myoclonus syndrome
 Oral and maxillofacial surgery
 Oral Morphine Solution
 Osteopathic Medical Student, a student Doctor of Osteopathic Medicine

Organisations
 Office of Muqtada al-Sadr (Mahdi Army)
 One Mission Society, a Christian missionary society
 Organisation for the Maintenance of Supplies, a right-wing political group in the UK in the 1920s
 International Liaison Department (Comintern) or OMS (Russian acronym)

Places
 IATA code for Omsk Tsentralny Airport
 Oms, Pyrénées-Orientales, a commune in southwestern France

Science and technology
 Office Mobile Service, Microsoft Office Mobile Service (OMS) is the messaging component developed for Outlook 2010 and SharePoint 2010. With OMS, users can integrate the mobile capabilities of Outlook and SharePoint with their mobile devices.
 Oracle Management Server, an executable component of Oracle database servers
 Orbital Maneuvering System, rocket engines used on the Space Shuttle orbiters
 Order Management System, business software used in logistics for order entry and processing
 Open Media Commons, an open-source internet group
 Open Metering System, a standardization effort in the field of smart meter
 Open Mobile System, the system used by OPhone
 Open Music System, once widely used MIDI interface software
 Optical Multiplex Section, the optical section layer that multiplexes wavelengths within the Optical Transport Network
 Object Management Server, A technology created and used by Workday, Inc. for storing, accessing and manipulating data.
 Outage management system, used by electricity operators to assist in restoring power
 Object Mirroring System, Vision Solutions OMS is a subset of the VisionSuite product OMS/ODS for replication of IBM Db2 objects in an IBM i environment.
 OMs, an abbreviation for mesylate

Other
 Oms, the humans in the 1973 animated film Fantastic Planet
 Oms, the humans in the novel on which Fantastic Planet was based, Oms en série
 Manuel de Oms y de Santa Pau, apparatchik in the War of Spanish Succession, Viceroy of Peru
 Odorless Mineral Spirits, used in painting and decorating
 Omsætningsafgift, a Danish tax
 One Minute Silence, a metal band
 Member state of the European Union, refers to an (Other) Member State(s)

See also

 
 
 
 OM (disambiguation)